Bernard André, O.E.S.A. (1450–1522), also known as Andreas, was a French Augustinian friar and poet, who was a noted chronicler of the reign of Henry VII of England, and poet laureate.

A native of Toulouse, André was tutor to Prince Arthur of England, and probably had a share in the education of the future King Henry VIII. He was also a tutor at Oxford. It is believed that he was blind. His writings are mostly in Latin, and are typical of the contemporary Renaissance, in thought and diction. His Historia Henrici Septimi was edited (1858) by James Gairdner, who says of André's chronicle of events in the Cornish Rebellion of 1497 that it is valuable "only as one of the very few sources of contemporary information in a particularly obscure period".

Bibliography 

 Bernard André, The Life of Henry VII, translated and introduced by Daniel Hobbins (New York: Italica Press, 2011).

References

Attribution
 The entry cites:
J. Gairdner, Memorials of Henry VII in Rolls Series (London 1858) — For André's Life of Henry VII; 

Gardiner and Mullinger, Introduction to the Study of English History (4th ed., 1903), 303, 304.

1450 births
1522 deaths
Writers from Toulouse
Augustinian friars
16th-century male writers
15th-century French Roman Catholic priests
16th-century French Roman Catholic priests
15th-century French poets
16th-century French poets
French expatriates in England
English chroniclers
15th-century French historians
16th-century French historians
French male poets
French male non-fiction writers